Bathua Shahpur is a village in Hilauli block of Unnao district, Uttar Pradesh, India. As of 2011, its population is 590, in 116 households, and it has no schools and no healthcare facilities.

The 1961 census recorded Bathua Shahpur (as "Batwa Shahpur") as comprising 1 hamlet, with a total population of 253 (141 male and 112 female), in 60 households and 57 physical houses. The area of the village was given as 195 acres.

References

Villages in Unnao district